Anna Ivanova (Bulgarian: Анна Иванова) (born ) is a Russian female volleyball player. She was part of the Russia women's national volleyball team.

She participated at the 2007 FIVB World Grand Prix.

References

External links
russiavolley.com

1987 births
Living people
Russian women's volleyball players
Place of birth missing (living people)